Rockwood Area Junior/Senior High School is a public junior/senior high school located in westcentral Somerset County. The school is grades 7-12 and serves about 400 students.

Alma Mater
All hail to thee,
Dear Rockwood High
To thee we will be true.
With everlasting memories
We owe our best to you.
Alma mater, alma mater,
We will pledge our loyalty
With voices raised
We will sing thy praise
For all eternity

Graduation Requirements
Rockwood students are required to complete 26 credits in coursework  in order to participate in commencement exercises. Credits are earned in grades 9-12

Courses Available 
Courses at Rockwood, according to the 2011-12 Course Catalog, include:
 English
 Languages - Including Spanish and French
 Math
 Business Technology
 Computer Technology
 Computer Science
 Science
 Agricultural Science
 Social Studies
 Yearbook
 Art
 Engineering & Technology
 Music - Including Vocal Groups
 Family and Consumer Sciences - Includes the FACS Required Course: Survival Skills
 Health / Physical Education
 Volunteer Courses - Includes: Partners (A peer to peer match with a disabled student), Library Aide and Gym Aide

Vocational Education
Students in grades 10-12 who wish to pursue training in a specific career path or field may attend the Somerset County Technology Center in Somerset Township.

Athletics
Rockwood Area participates in PIAA District V: Students come  from Turkeyfoot Valley to participate in Football, Golf, Soccer, and Volleyball, while students from Berlin Brothersvalley come to participate in Wrestling.

References

Public high schools in Pennsylvania
Schools in Somerset County, Pennsylvania
Public middle schools in Pennsylvania